Marie Rainford was an American film actress.

She appeared in A Prize Package (1912), directed by Siegmund Lubin and starring Eleanor Caines, Jerold T. Hevener and Jack Barrymore; and The Decoy (1914), starring Charles Horan.

Filmography

References

External links
 

American silent film actresses
20th-century American actresses